Saint Pius X Catholic High School is a private Catholic university preparatory secondary school in Kansas City, Missouri (U.S.).   It is located in the Diocese of Kansas City–Saint Joseph.

Saint Pius X Catholic High School opened in 1956.  The student body is composed of ninth through twelfth-grade students.  The school is adjacent to St. Patrick Parish & School off of Interstate 29. The school's current principal is Joe Monachino Jr.

Athletics
Competitive Teams Include:

Men's and Women's teams
Basketball
Cross Country
Golf
Soccer
Swimming and Diving
Tennis
Track and Field

Men's only
Baseball
Football
Wrestling

Women's only
Cheerleading
Pom/Dance Squad
Softball
Volleyball

Notable alumni
  – Missouri House of Representatives (2006–2010)

References 

Catholic secondary schools in Missouri
Educational institutions established in 1956
High schools in Clay County, Missouri
High schools in Kansas City, Missouri
Roman Catholic Diocese of Kansas City–Saint Joseph
1956 establishments in Missouri